Minuscule 549 (in the Gregory-Aland numbering), 536 (Scrivener's numbering), A 136 (in the Soden numbering), is a Greek minuscule manuscript of the New Testament, on parchment. Palaeographically it has been assigned to the 11th century.
The manuscript has complex contents. It was adapted for liturgical use.

Description 
The codex contains the text of the four Gospels on 217 parchment leaves (size ). The text is written in one column per page, 12 lines per page for biblical text, and 33 lines per page with a Commentary.

The biblical text is surrounded by a commentary. The commentary to the Gospel of Mark is of Victorinus authorship.

Text 
The Greek text of the codex is a representative of the Byzantine text-type. Aland placed it in Category V.
Wisse did not make a profile to this manuscript.

History 
Formerly the manuscript was held in the Xenophontos monastery at Athos peninsula. In 1837 Robert Curzon, Lord Zouche, brought this manuscript to England (along with the manuscripts 547, 550, 551). The entire collection of Curzon was bequeathed by his daughter in 1917 to the British Museum, where it had been deposited, by his son, since 1876.

The manuscript was added to the list of the New Testament manuscript by F. H. A. Scrivener (536) and C. R. Gregory (549). It was examined by Scrivener, Dean Burgon, and Gregory.

It is currently housed at the British Library (Add MS 39592) in London.

See also 

 List of New Testament minuscules
 Biblical manuscript
 Textual criticism

References

Further reading 
 S. Emmel, Catalogue of Materials for Writing, Early Writings on Tablets and Stones, rolled and other Manuscripts and Oriental Manuscript Books, in the Library of the Honourable Robert Curzon (London 1849).

External links 

Greek New Testament minuscules
11th-century biblical manuscripts
British Library additional manuscripts